Live at the Roxy is a two-disc live album by The Wailers, released in 2003. The album contains a complete concert, recorded on 26 May 1976 at The Roxy in West Hollywood California, during the Rastaman Vibration tour.

This concert was originally broadcast live on the KMET radio station in Los Angeles. Because of the radio simulcast, this concert became widely bootlegged beginning in 1976. In 2002 the Marley family released the concert on the reissued Rastaman Vibration: Deluxe Edition, with a previously unreleased single "Smile Jamaica".

On 24 June 2003 Tuff Gong released the complete concert, including the previously unreleased twenty-eight-minute encore, containing "Positive Vibration" and medley "Get Up, Stand Up / No More Trouble / War".

The concert was MC'd by Tony Garnett, the band's one-time road manager.

Track listing

Musicians
Bob Marley – lead vocals, rhythm guitar
I Threes (Rita Marley, Judy Mowatt, Marcia Griffiths) – background vocals
Aston Barrett "Family Man" – bass guitar
Carlton Barrett "Carly" – drums
Earl "Chinna" Smith, Donald Kinsey – guitar
Earl Lindo "Wire", Tyrone Downie – keyboards
Alvin Patterson "Seeco" – percussion

References

Bob Marley and the Wailers live albums
2003 live albums
Albums recorded at the Roxy Theatre
Island Records live albums
Tuff Gong albums